Deliathis quadritaeniator is a species of beetle in the family Cerambycidae. It was described by White in 1846. It is known from Panama, Costa Rica, Ecuador, Colombia, and Venezuela.

References

Lamiini
Beetles described in 1846